Greek National Road 29 (Greek: Εθνική Οδός 29, abbreviated as EO29) is a single carriageway road  in central Greece. It connects  Itea, Phocis with Steiri.

29
Roads in Central Greece